Ishk Par Zor Nahi (English Translation: No Control on Love) is an Indian Hindi-language television drama series. It premiered from 15 March 2021 to 20 August 2021 on Sony TV. It is produced by Gul Khan and Karishma Jain under 4 Lions Films, it stars Param Singh and Akshita Mudgal.

Plot 
Ahaan Veer Malhotra is a no nonsense and disciplined businessman who believes in family values and ethic whereas Ishqi is a girl who believes in love and that others should fall in love too. One day Ahaan and Ishqi cross each other since Ishqi needs a ride. Ahaan finds out that Ishqi is helping a couple elope and kicks them out of his car. Ishqi then steals his car which cause Ahaan to press charges on Ishqi for stealing her car while on the other hand Ishqi loses her job. Ishqi is set to marry Mayank Kapoor who is Ahaan's best friend but Mayank is marrying Ishqi to make Sonu jealous. Sonu is Ahaan's younger sister and she is going to marry Raj Rathore. Savitri is Ahaan and Sonu's mother who apparently left them for another guy which led to Ahaan hating her to the core. It is revealed that Savitri was in a Mental Asylum because of Ahaan's grandmother.

Cast

Main 
Param Singh as Ahaan Veer Malhotra: Veer and Savitri's elder son; Sonu's brother; Kartik's cousin; Ishqi's husband (2021)

Akshita Mudgal as Ishqi Malhotra: Sudha's niece; Ahaan's wife (2021)
Rajat Verma as Kartik Malhotra: Ritu and Mr. Malhotra's son; Ahaan and Sonu's cousin. (2021) 
Shagun Sharma as Sonali "Sonu" Malhotra Rathore: Veer and Savitri's younger daughter; Ahaan's sister; Raj's wife (2021)
Lakshya Handa as Raj Rathore: Sarla's son; Sonu's husband (2021)

Recurring 
Neha Rana as Rhea Mehta: Viren and Radhika's daughter; Ahaan's ex-fiancée (2021)
Aakash Gupta as Mayank Kapoor: Shekhar and Suman's son; Ishqi's ex-fiancé (2021)
Shekhar Gill replaced Gupta as Mayank (2021)
Abha Parmar as Durga Devi "Dadi" Malhotra: Veer and Mr. Malhotra's mother; Ahaan, Kartik and Sonu's grandmother (2021)
Mamta Verma as Ritu Malhotra: Mr. Malhotra's wife; Kartik's mom; Ahaan and Sonu's aunt (2021)
Kapil Soni as Chachu, Veer's brother (2021)
Jaswinder Gardner as Savitri Malhotra: Veer's widow; Ahaan and Sonu's mother (2021)
Beena Maljie as Sarla Rathore, Raj's mother (2021)
Arundhati Bandhopadhyay as Ginni, Sarla's best friend (2021) 
Kimmy Kaur as Sudha Maasi, Ishqi's maternal aunt  (2021)
Preety Arora Sharma as Suman Kapoor, Mayank's mother  (2021)
Jai Singh as Viren Mehta, Rhea's father  (2021)
Hetal Yadav as Radhika Mehta, Rhea's mother (2021)
Anup Ingale as Bhola, the Malhotras' housekeeper(2021)
Rajiv Kumar as Suraj: an advocate, Veer's ex-friend(2021)

Production

Development 
The show was in pre-production for a long time. Param Singh signed this show in July 2020, when the production house approached him. Casting for Ishqi's character took a long time and finally Akshita Mudgal signed as Ishqi in October 2020. Filming began in November 2020.

The pandemic's second wave delayed the shoot in mid-April 2021. The cast and crew relocated to Daman and Diu. They came back and resumed shooting in Mumbai in the start of July 2021.

Release
The first promo of the series was released on 28 February 2021 featuring Param Singh and Akshita Mudgal.

References

External links
 
 Ishk Par Zor Nahi on Sony TV
 Ishk Par Zor Nahi  on SonyLIV

Hindi-language television shows
Indian drama television series
Indian television soap operas
Sony Entertainment Television original programming
2021 Indian television series debuts